Brovinia is a rural locality in the North Burnett Region, Queensland, Australia.

History 
The locality takes its name from a pastoral run established in about 1850. The name was written as Brorinia on maps in 1872 and 1878, but has been written as Brovinia since 1887. A postal receiving office was established in 1888 but closed in 1889.

Geography
The Auburn River forms the northern boundary.

Road infrastructure
The Mundubbera Durong Road (State Route 75) runs through from north-east to south.

References 

North Burnett Region
Localities in Queensland